Alice Fagioli (born 11 June 1980) is an Italian sprint canoer who competed in the late 2000s. At the 2008 Summer Olympics in Beijing, she finished eighth in the K-4 500 m event.

References

1980 births
Canoeists at the 2008 Summer Olympics
Italian female canoeists
Living people
Olympic canoeists of Italy